Idionotus is a genus of shield-backed katydids in the family Tettigoniidae. There are about seven described species in Idionotus.

Species
These seven species belong to the genus Idionotus:
 Idionotus brunneus Scudder, 1901
 Idionotus incurvus Rentz & Birchim, 1968
 Idionotus lundgreni Rentz & Birchim, 1968
 Idionotus similis Caudell, 1934
 Idionotus siskiyou Hebard, 1934 (siskiyou shieldback)
 Idionotus tehachapi Hebard, 1934 (tehachapi shieldback)
 Idionotus tuolumne Hebard, 1934

References

Further reading

 

Tettigoniinae
Articles created by Qbugbot